Patricia Yanira Rivas Miranda (born February 15, 1980 in San Salvador) is a Salvadoran sport shooter. She won a bronze medal in the small-bore rifle prone at the 2001 American Continental Championships in Fort Benning, Georgia, United States, and was selected to compete for El Salvador in air rifle shooting at the 2004 Summer Olympics. Rivas trains for the national shooting team under longtime coach Reynaido Flores.

Rivas qualified as a lone shooter for the Salvadoran squad in the women's 10 m air rifle at the 2004 Summer Olympics in Athens. She had been granted an Olympic invitation for her country by ISSF and IOC, having registered a minimum qualifying standard of 380 from her outside-final finish at the Pan American Games in Santo Domingo, Dominican Republic a year earlier. Rivas put up a more spectacular aim to set her career best of 393 points in the qualifying round after nailing a perfect 100 on the third 10-shot series, but her score was sufficient to land her in a two-way draw with India's Anjali Bhagwat for twentieth position.

References

External links

1980 births
Living people
Salvadoran female sport shooters
Olympic shooters of El Salvador
Shooters at the 2004 Summer Olympics
Pan American Games competitors for El Salvador
Shooters at the 2003 Pan American Games
Shooters at the 2007 Pan American Games
Sportspeople from San Salvador
21st-century Salvadoran women